Frank Thomas Bullen (April 5, 1857 – March 1, 1915), British author and novelist, was born of poor parents in Paddington, London, on 5 April 1857, and was educated for a few years at a dame school and Westbourne school, Paddington. At the age of 9, his aunt, who was his guardian, died. He then left school and took up work as an errand boy. In 1869 he went to sea and travelled to all parts of the world in various capacities including that of second mate of the Harbinger and chief mate of the Day Dawn, under Capt. John R. H. Ward jun in 1879 when she was dismasted and disabled. 
Having spent 15 years of his life at sea, since the tender age of 12, he would later describe the hardships of his early life thus:
I have been beaten by a negro lad as big again as myself, and only a Frenchman interfered on my behalf. Those were the days when boys in Geordie colliers or East Coast fishing smacks were often beaten to insanity and jumped overboard, or were done to death in truly savage fashion, and all that was necessary to account for their non returning was a line in the log to the effect that they had been washed or had fallen overboard.
A parallel may be drawn with Joseph Conrad's career at sea aboard Torrens 1891–1893.
He was a clerk in the Meteorological Office from 1883 to 1889. His reputation was made over the publication of The Cruise of the "Cachalot" (1898); and he also wrote, amongst other books, Idylls of the Sea (1899); Sea Wrack (1903); The Call of the Deep (1907) and A Compleat Sea Cook (1912), besides many articles and essays. He lectured extensively and was highly critical of Australasia's lack of defences against what he saw as imminent naval threats from Germany and Japan. He died at Madeira on 1 March 1915.

Bibliography 
 The Cruise of the Cachalot: Round the World After Sperm Whales, 1898
 The Log of a Sea-Waif, 1899
 Idylls of the Sea, 1899
 The Way They Have In the Navy, 1899
 With Christ At Sea, 1900
 The Men of the Merchant Service, 1900
 Deep Sea Plunderings, 1901
 A Sack of Shakings, 1901
 With Christ in sailor town; what the seamen's mission is doing, 1901 
 The Apostles of the South-East, 1901
 A Whaleman's Wife, 1902
 Sea Wrack, 1903
 Denizens of the Deep, 1903-1904
 Sea Puritans, 1904
 Back to Sunny Seas, 1905
 Frank Brown, Sea Apprentice, 1906
 Sea Spray, 1906
 Our Heritage, the Sea, 1906
 The Call of the Deep, 1907
 Advance, Australasia!, 1907
 A Bounty Boy: Being Some Adventures of a Christian Barbarian on an unpremeditated Trip Round the World, 1907
 The Confessions of a Tradesman, 1908
 A Son of the Sea, 1908
 The Seed of the Righteous, 1908
 Creatures of the Sea, 1909
 Beyond, 1909
 The Bitter South 1909
 Cut off from the world, 1909
 The Salvage of a Sailor, 191-?
 Told in the dog watches, 1910
 Young Nemesis; or, The Pirate Hunter, 1910
 Fighting the Icebergs, 1910
 A Compleat Sea Cook, 1912
 Songs of Sea Labour, 1914
 Recollections: the reminiscences of the busy life of one who has played the varied parts of sailor, author & lecturer, 1915

Obituary 
Royal Geographic Society, 22 February 1915

The well-known lecturer, and writer of stirring sea stories, Mr. Frank T. Bullen, who died towards the end of February, was a Fellow of this Society from 1898 until a couple of years ago. A son of Mr. F. R. Bullen, of Crewkerne, Dorset, he led a roving and adventurous life from quite an early age, and many of the most thrilling episodes in his books were records of his own experiences. After various adventures on shore he went to sea in 1869, and for some years roughed it in various capacities in the merchant service, suffering great hardships, as vividly described in The Log of a Sea Waif and other books. He was keenly interested in the bettering the condition and raising the moral tone of our merchant seamen, and many of his books were of a semi-religious character. In his latter years he was known as a successful lecturer and a writer of miscellaneous stories and articles in addition to his books. He had lived for some years at Melbourne, near Cambridge.

Notes

References
 The Geographical Journal, Vol. 45, No. 4 (April 1915), p. 344.

External links
 
 
 
 

1857 births
1915 deaths
20th-century English novelists
English male novelists
20th-century English male writers
Maritime writers